j97 can refer to:

 General Electric J97, a turbojet engine designed and built by General Electric
 Jack (Vietnamese singer), Vietnamese singer also known as J97

